Moerewa is a small town in the Northland Region of the North Island of New Zealand. It is located close to the Bay of Islands five kilometres to the west of Kawakawa.

Moerewa is a service town for the surrounding farming industry. Its main industry is the freezing works.  During the economic slump of the 1980s, many of the town's industries were badly affected, and unemployment soared. For this reason, the town's population has dwindled in recent years, although there are signs of an economic revival in the district.

Demographics

Moerewa had a population of 1,632 at the 2018 New Zealand census, an increase of 288 people (21.4%) since the 2013 census, and an increase of 222 people (15.7%) since the 2006 census. There were 432 households, comprising 810 males and 822 females, giving a sex ratio of 0.99 males per female. The median age was 29.2 years (compared with 37.4 years nationally), with 480 people (29.4%) aged under 15 years, 351 (21.5%) aged 15 to 29, 645 (39.5%) aged 30 to 64, and 159 (9.7%) aged 65 or older.

Ethnicities were 22.8% European/Pākehā, 90.4% Māori, 6.6% Pacific peoples, 1.1% Asian, and 0.2% other ethnicities. People may identify with more than one ethnicity.

The percentage of people born overseas was 4.6, compared with 27.1% nationally.

Although some people chose not to answer the census's question about religious affiliation, 32.0% had no religion, 42.8% were Christian, 13.1% had Māori religious beliefs, 0.2% were Hindu, 1.1% were Muslim, 0.2% were Buddhist and 1.3% had other religions.

Of those at least 15 years old, 69 (6.0%) people had a bachelor's or higher degree, and 366 (31.8%) people had no formal qualifications. The median income was $19,400, compared with $31,800 nationally. 24 people (2.1%) earned over $70,000 compared to 17.2% nationally. The employment status of those at least 15 was that 438 (38.0%) people were employed full-time, 120 (10.4%) were part-time, and 138 (12.0%) were unemployed.

Marae
Moerewa has three Ngāpuhi marae:

 Horomanga Marae and meeting house are affiliated with Ngāti Hine.
 Ōtiria Marae and Tūmatauenga are affiliated with the hapū of Ngāti Hine, Ngāti Kōpaki and Ngāti Te Ara.
 Tereawatea Marae and meeting house are affiliated with Ngāti Hine.
 Te Rito Marae and meeting house are affiliated with Ngāti Hine.

In October 2020, the Government committed $362,468 from the Provincial Growth Fund to upgrade Te Rito Marae, creating 10 jobs.

Education
Moerewa School is a coeducational full primary (years 1-8) school with a roll of  students as of  Moerewa School opened in 1913, and merged with Otiria School at the beginning of 2005.

Te Kura Kaupapa Māori o Taumarere is a coeducational composite (years 1-13) school with a roll of  students as of  It is a Kura Kaupapa Māori school which teaches fully in the Māori language. The school was largely destroyed in an arson attack on 23 March 2008. Prefab buildings were used to keep the school running and a new block was built in 2010. A substantial redevelopment began in 2016.

Transport 
Moerewa is on State Highway 1.

Moerewa was formerly served by the Opua Branch of the North Auckland Line railway.  The line was originally built to link the Bay of Islands with Whangarei, and the complete route opened on 13 April 1911.  From December 1925 until November 1956, the Northland Express train ran through Moerewa, providing a direct service to Auckland.  After it ceased to run, passengers were served by mixed trains between Opua and Whangarei until 18 July 1976.  In 1985, freight services ceased and the line from Moerewa to Kawakawa was dismantled. The line from Otiria, the present northern terminus, to Moerewa remains in place but is disused.

References

Further reading

External links
 Moerewa town website
 Moerewa School website

Far North District
Populated places in the Northland Region
Bay of Islands